Jillian Marie Culton (born March 19, 1973) is an American animator, director, and screenwriter. With her directorial debut on Sony's first animated film, Open Season, she became the first female principal director of a big budget, computer-animated feature.

Education and career 
Previously, she studied at the Character Animation program at the California Institute of the Arts, where she later taught animation.

She was also a storyboard artist for various Pixar films such as Toy Story, Toy Story 2, A Bug's Life and also co-wrote the original treatment for Monsters, Inc., and continued to become the Head of Development.

She animated on Toy Story and served as a Directing Animator at Turner Features for the film Cats Don't Dance.

Along with Anthony Stacchi, she helped to develop Curious George while working at Industrial Light & Magic.

In 2003, Culton joined Sony Pictures Animation, which launched a year before to produce CG animated films. During her years at Sony, Culton, along with directing Open Season and executive producing Open Season 2,  also developed Hotel Transylvania.

As of 2010, Culton was at DreamWorks Animation. For some time, she was writing and directing an animated film (now titled Abominable) about a little girl and a Yeti, tentatively titled Everest, but by 2016, she had left the project.
However, she came back to the project to direct again.

Filmography
The Princess and the Cobbler (1993) (animator: Calvert/Cobbler Productions)
Toy Story (1995) (story artist)
Cats Don't Dance (1997) (supervising animator: Supporting Animal Characters, storyboard artist)
A Bug's Life (1998) (additional storyboard artist)
Toy Story 2 (1999) (character designer: new characters, story artist)
 Shrek (2001) (story artist)
Monsters, Inc. (2001) (story, development story supervisor, visual development)
Open Season (2006) (director, story)
Boog and Elliot's Midnight Bun Run (2006) (director, writer)
Surf's Up (2007) (special thanks)
 Open Season 2 (2009) (executive producer)
 Shrek Forever After (2010) (special thanks, character designer: new characters, story artist)
 Abominable (2019) (director, writer)

References

External links

 

1973 births
Living people
Place of birth missing (living people)
People from Ventura County, California
Animators from California
American animated film directors
California Institute of the Arts alumni
American women animators
Pixar people
Sony Pictures Animation people
DreamWorks Animation people